LawWithoutWalls (LWOW) is an educational model created by Michele DeStefano and Michael Bossone in 2010 and sponsored by The University of Miami School of Law. It is a cooperative partnership among more than 30 leading law and business schools in 15 countries and a mix of lawyers, business professionals, entrepreneurs, and venture capitalists from companies around the world. 

LawWithoutWalls is a part-virtual collaboratory which is designed to enable students, academics, and professionals to connect over issues facing the legal profession, solve legal problems, and develop the skills students need to compete in a global marketplace.

Methodology
After an exacting vetting process, selected students from participating schools are teamed up with entrepreneur, academic, and practitioner mentors to identify a problem in legal education or practice and develop a business plan that solves that problem.  They begin this work in January at a KickOff, an in-person event at one of the participating schools that is designed to enhance team building and self-awareness skills. After the KickOff, from January to April, LawWithoutWalls participants attend weekly Virtual Thought Leader Sessions. A virtual "classroom" wherein experts in law, entrepreneurialism, and business share their multidisciplinary viewpoints on the needed revolutions in legal education and practice and teach professional, business, financial, and entrepreneurial skills. These Virtual Sessions are conducted through Adobe Connect and each participant connects from his/her own computer with a webcam and microphone.  Additionally, during this same time period, teams continue to meet virtually to develop their business plans.  In April, students test the viability of bringing their ideas to market by presenting their business plans to a multidisciplinary panel of judges including venture capitalists, such as True Ventures and Tennessee Community Ventures Fund.

Participating schools
Participating schools are Bifröst University, Bucerius Law School, Harvard Law School, Graduate Institute of International and Development Studies, IE Business School, IE Law School, Indiana University Maurer School of Law, Maastricht University, National Law School of India University, New York Law School, Osgoode Hall Law School, York University, Peking University School of Transnational Law, Pontifical Catholic University of Chile, Stanford Law School, Tel Aviv University Buchmann Faculty of Law, UCL Faculty of Laws, University of Miami School of Law, Université de Montréal Faculty of Law, Faculdade de Direito da Universidade de São Paulo, University of St. Gallen Law School, Sydney Law School, and Wharton School of the University of Pennsylvania.

References

External links
 Official website

University of Miami
Legal education in the United States